This is a list of people who have served as Lord-Lieutenant of Suffolk. Since 1642, all Lord Lieutenants have also been Custos Rotulorum of Suffolk.

Lord Lieutenants of Suffolk

Sir Anthony Wingfield 1551–1552 jointly with
? 1551–?
Thomas Radclyffe, 3rd Earl of Sussex 1557–1583
Thomas Wentworth, 2nd Baron Wentworth 1561
Henry Carey, 1st Baron Hunsdon 3 July 1585 – 23 July 1596
vacant
Thomas Howard, 1st Earl of Suffolk 3 July 1605– 28 May 1626
Theophilus Howard, 2nd Earl of Suffolk 15 June 1626 – 3 June 1640
James Howard, 3rd Earl of Suffolk 16 June 1640 – 1642 jointly with
Sir Thomas Jermyn 16 June 1640 – 1642
Interregnum
James Howard, 3rd Earl of Suffolk 25 July 1660 – 12 March 1681
Henry Bennet, 1st Earl of Arlington 12 March 1681 – 6 May 1685
Henry FitzRoy, 1st Duke of Grafton 6 May 1685 – 28 March 1689
Charles Cornwallis, 3rd Baron Cornwallis 28 March 1689 – 29 April 1698
Charles Cornwallis, 4th Baron Cornwallis 14 June 1698 – 16 June 1703
Lionel Tollemache, 3rd Earl of Dysart 16 June 1703 – 25 April 1705
Charles FitzRoy, 2nd Duke of Grafton 25 April 1705 – 6 May 1757
Augustus FitzRoy, 3rd Duke of Grafton 4 December 1757 – 10 February 1763
Charles Maynard, 1st Viscount Maynard 10 February 1763 – 1 June 1769
Augustus FitzRoy, 3rd Duke of Grafton 1 June 1769 – 3 July 1790
George FitzRoy, 4th Duke of Grafton 3 July 1790 – 19 January 1844
John Rous, 2nd Earl of Stradbroke 19 January 1844 – 27 January 1886
Frederick Hervey, 3rd Marquess of Bristol 17 February 1886 – 7 August 1907
Sir William Brampton Gurdon 21 October 1907 – 1910
Sir Courtenay Warner, 1st Baronet 8 July 1910 – 15 December 1934
George Rous, 3rd Earl of Stradbroke 4 February 1935 – 20 December 1947
John Rous, 4th Earl of Stradbroke 2 April 1948 – 24 April 1978
Sir Joshua Rowley, 7th Baronet 24 April 1978 – 11 February 1994
John Ganzoni, 2nd Baron Belstead 11 February 1994 – 30 June 2003
John Tollemache, 5th Baron Tollemache 30 June 2003 – 13 December 2014
Clare FitzRoy, Dowager Countess of Euston 13 December 2014 – Present

References
 

Suffolk